Naytia is a genus of brackish water snails, gastropod mollusks in the subfamily Nassariinae of the family Nassariidae.

Species
Species within the genus Naytia include:
 Naytia glabrata (G. B. Sowerby II, 1842)
 Naytia granulosa (Lamarck, 1822)
 Naytia johni (Monterosato, 1889)
 Naytia priscardi Bozzetti, 2006

References

External links
 
 Adams, H. & Adams, A. (1853-1858). The genera of Recent Mollusca; arranged according to their organization. London, van Voorst.
  Galindo, L. A.; Puillandre, N.; Utge, J.; Lozouet, P.; Bouchet, P. (2016). The phylogeny and systematics of the Nassariidae revisited (Gastropoda, Buccinoidea). Molecular Phylogenetics and Evolution. 99: 337-353

Nassariidae